Betty Crocker Star Matinee is a US television anthology hosted by Adelaide Hawley under the General Mills persona of Betty Crocker. There were 26 episodes that aired from 1951-52 on WJZ-TV, at that time an American Broadcasting Company affiliate in New York City.

Adelaide Hawley portrayed the iconic Crocker in the series. Notable guest stars included Audrey Hepburn, David Niven, Veronica Lake, Basil Rathbone, June Lockhart, Raymond Massey, Thomas Mitchell, Teresa Wright, Celeste Holm, and Robert Cummings.

References

External links
Betty Crocker Star Matinee at CVTA with episode list

1950s American anthology television series
1951 American television series debuts
1952 American television series endings
American Broadcasting Company original programming